Christiane Knacke (later Driesener then Sommer, born 17 April 1962) is a retired swimmer from East Germany who specialized in the 100 m butterfly. In this event she won a silver medal at the 1977 European Aquatics Championships and a bronze medal at the 1980 Summer Olympics. She was the first woman to break the one-minute barrier in the event, when she clocked 59.78 on 28 August 1977, setting a new world record.

In 1989 she admitted to using performance-enhancing drugs against her will.

She married twice, changing her last name to Driesener and then to Sommer. Her daughter Jennifer was born in 1983.

References

1962 births
Living people
Swimmers from Berlin
People from East Berlin
German female swimmers
German female butterfly swimmers
Swimmers at the 1980 Summer Olympics
Olympic swimmers of East Germany
Olympic bronze medalists for East Germany
Place of birth missing (living people)
World record setters in swimming
Olympic bronze medalists in swimming
Medalists at the 1980 Summer Olympics
European Aquatics Championships medalists in swimming
German sportspeople in doping cases
Doping cases in swimming
20th-century German women